Kavya is a 1995 Indian Kannada-language romantic drama film directed and co-produced by Kodlu Ramakrishna and based on the novel written by Vijaya Thandavamurthy and Ramakrishna himself. The film cast includes Ramkumar, Sudharani and Sithara with Sudharani playing the titular role. The film was produced under Spandana Films banner and the original score and soundtrack were composed by Sadhu Kokila.

Cast
 Ramkumar 
 Sudharani as Kavya
 Sithara 
 Kalyan Kumar
 Ramakrishna
 Gorur Venkatram
 Girija Lokesh
 Chandrashekar
 Jaishree Sridhar
 Ramachandra

Soundtrack
The music of the film was composed by Sadhu Kokila and lyrics written by Prof. Doddarange Gowda and Geethapriya. It also has a couplet written by poet Kuvempu. The soundtrack also features one song sung by actor Rajkumar.

Prof. Doddarange Gowda was awarded with the Karnataka State Film Award for Best Lyricist for the year 1995-96 for the song "Vandane Vandane" written by him.

References

External source

 Tavarina Tottilu(1996)

1995 films
1990s Kannada-language films
Indian romantic drama films
Films based on Indian novels
Films directed by Kodlu Ramakrishna
1995 romantic drama films

kn:ಕಾವ್ಯ